The comparative case (abbreviated ) is a grammatical case which marks a nominal as "comparative" in some sense.  The term comparative case can designate a case marker which performs the role of marking likeness of a noun to something else, and it can also refer to a discrete grammatical case which marks the noun serving as the standard of comparison in a comparative construction. It is distinct from  the term comparative degree, in that comparative case is a morpheme appearing on nouns while comparative degree morphemes appear on adjectives or adverbs.

An example of a comparative case which designates similarity to something is found in Mari, where the comparative case is the suffix  as in (1):

Mari also uses the comparative case in regards to languages, when denoting the language a person is speaking, writing, or hearing. Then, however, the accentuation varies slightly from the standard case. Usually, the suffix is not stressed. When it is used with languages, however, it is stressed.

An example of the comparative case marking the noun serving as the standard of comparison comes from the Chechen suffix . For example, in (2) it appears on  'ice' in  'cold as ice':

Similarly, in the Turkic language Sakha (Yakut), the noun serving as the standard of comparison can be marked with the comparative case suffix -TĀGAr as in (3):

Nivkh is another language with this comparative case suffix (-yk/-ak), as in (4):

This latter sense of comparative case is similar to locational comparatives, where a locational case such as the ablative marks the noun in a standard of comparison, found in Turkic languages like (5) from Uzbek:

See also
 Semblative case
 Formal case
 Equative case

References

Bibliography
 
 
 
 Зорина, З. Г., Г. С. Крылова, and Э. С. Якимова. Марийский язык для всех, ч. 1. Йошкар-Ола: Марийское книжное издательство, 1990;

Grammatical cases
Comparisons